John Winfield Winnett Jr. (December 22, 1928 in Los Angeles, California – October 5, 2007 in Wellington, Florida ) was an American equestrian who competed in the 1972 Summer Olympics.

Olympics
Winnett competed as a member of the United States Equestrian Dressage team in the 1972 Olympics in Munich, Germany and as a reserve rider in the 1976 Olympics held in Montreal, Canada. In 1980 Winnett qualified for the U.S. Olympic team but did not compete due to the Olympic Committee's boycott of the 1980 Summer Olympics in Moscow, Russia. He was one of 461 athletes to receive a Congressional Gold Medal instead.

References

External links
 

1928 births
2007 deaths
American male equestrians
American dressage riders
Olympic equestrians of the United States
Equestrians at the 1972 Summer Olympics
Congressional Gold Medal recipients
Equestrians at the 1975 Pan American Games
Pan American Games gold medalists for the United States
Pan American Games silver medalists for the United States
Pan American Games medalists in equestrian
Medalists at the 1975 Pan American Games